Barnhill Community High School, sometimes shortened to Barnhill, is a coeducational secondary school located in the Yeading area of the London Borough of Hillingdon, England. In 2012 the school converted to an academy.

Its predecessor, Barnhill Secondary School, was originally opened in 1950, and celebrated 21 years in 1971. Barnhill Community High School replaced the old Barnhill Secondary Modern (converted to Comprehensive by Hillingdon Borough Council in 1974) School after it had been previously demolished. The new school was established in 1999 in response to growing need and immense pressure from the local community. It was the first Private Finance Initiative (PFI) school to be set up, but the second to open. In 2015, a new Executive Head, Tracey Hemming, was appointed. 

The school is part of a Multi-Academy Trust, the Barnhill Partnership, with Belmore Primary School.

The school was inspected in 2012 and judged Good. In 2016 a short inspection was carried out and again the judgement was Good.

In 2017, Preetmal Poonith, a mathematics teacher at the school, was awarded a Silver Pearson Teaching Award for Teacher of the Year in a Secondary School.

References

External links
Ofsted inspection reports on the school
Barnhill Community High School's website
Barnhill Comprehensive School (1980) Football match clips (YouTube)
Photographs and documents from Barnside Secondary Modern School's history

Secondary schools in the London Borough of Hillingdon
Educational institutions established in 1950
1950 establishments in England
Academies in the London Borough of Hillingdon